Mot nya tider (Toward New Times) is a Swedish film from 1939 directed by Sigurd Wallén. It portrays the dissolution of the union between Norway and Sweden. The film was shot from February to May 1939 at Sandrew Studios in Stockholm and in Karlstad, Oslo, and Trondheim.

Cast
 Victor Sjöström as Hjalmar Branting, Swedish politician
 Sigurd Wallén as Kalle Lundgren, a master painter
 Bengt Djurberg as Johan Dahlberg, an engineer
 Solveig Hedengran as Elin Ström
 Gun-Mari Kjellström as Eva, Johan and Elin's daughter as an infant
 Ulla Hodell as Eva as a young girl
 Marianne Aminoff as Eva as an adult
 Karl Holter as Henrik Thygesen, a Norwegian
 Georg Løkkeberg as Christian Thygesen, Henrik's brother, a Norwegian lieutenant / Helge Thygesen as an adult
 Åke Johansson as Helge Thygesen, Christian's son as a child
 Ingela Lundstedt as Sigrid Bergström, Christian Thygesen's fiancé, Helge's mother
 Thor Modéen as Lindqvist
 Ingolf Schanche as Christian Michelsen, Norwegian prime minister
 David Knudsen as Jørgen Løvland, Norwegian minister of foreign affairs
 Leif Amble-Næss as Harald Bothner, Norwegian minister
 Sigval Kvam as Edvard Hagerup Bull, Norwegian minister
 Olof Sandborg as King Oscar II
 Karl-Magnus Thulstrup as Crown Prince Gustav
 Sven Bergvall as Christian Lundeberg, Swedish prime minister
 Ragnar Widestedt as Fredrik Wachtmeister, Swedish foreign minister
 Rune Carlsten as Karl Staaff, Swedish politician
 Arne Lindblad as August Palm, Swedish politician
 Willy Peters as Per Albin Hansson, Swedish politician
 Carl Barcklind as Semmy Rubenson, Stockholm chief of police
 Gösta Cederlund as Governor Curry Treffenberg
 Stina Ståhle as Christina Nilsson, Swedish operatic soprano
 Georg Fernquist as Heinrich Robert Berns, a pastry chef
 Hjalmar Meissner as August Meissner
 Tord Bernheim as Hilding Nihlén, a dandy at Berns Salonger
 Carin Swensson as Hulda Malmström, a Swedish actress
 Carl Apolloff as Viscount António da Cunha Soto Maior, a Portuguese envoy

References

External links 
 
 Mot nya tider at The Swedish Film Database

1939 films
Swedish black-and-white films
Swedish drama films
Films directed by Sigurd Wallén
1930s Swedish-language films
1930s Swedish films
1939 drama films